Aidu is a village in Viljandi Parish, Viljandi County, Estonia.

Aidu is the birthplace of Estonian poet, playwright and writer Mart Raud (1903-1980) and writer Minni Nurme (1917-1994).

References

Villages in Viljandi County
Kreis Fellin